was a Japanese biologist. He is most renowned as the inventor of Gakutensoku, Japan's first functional robot.  He was the father of actor Kō Nishimura.

Biography
Makoto was born on March 26, 1883 in Matsumoto, Nagano Prefecture.

During his life, he served as an example for early environmentalists. When he discovered a tree growing on his plot of land, he refused to cut it down. Instead he decided to build his house around it so that it grew in his living room.

Over the years, he worked as a professor at Hokkaido University as well as taught in Kyoto and Manchuria. He also studied botany at Columbia University.

References

Japanese biologists
1883 births
1956 deaths
Columbia University alumni
Academic staff of Hokkaido University
People from Matsumoto, Nagano
20th-century biologists